The International Society of Arboriculture, commonly known as ISA, is an international non-profit organization headquartered in Atlanta, Georgia, United States. The ISA serves the tree care industry as a paid membership association and a credentialing organization that promotes the professional practice of arboriculture. ISA focuses on providing research, technology, and education opportunities for tree care professionals to develop their arboricultural expertise. ISA also works to educate the general public about the benefits of trees and the need for proper tree care.

Worldwide, ISA has more than 22,000 members and 31,000 ISA-certified tree care professionals with 59 chapters, associate organizations, and professional affiliates throughout North America, Asia, Oceania, Europe, and South America.

References

External links
International Society of Arboriculture Home Page

Agricultural organizations based in the United States
Clubs and societies in the United States
International forestry organizations
Forestry societies
Arborists
Non-profit organizations based in Georgia (U.S. state)
Urban forestry organizations